Mykolas Dluskis  (September 1760 – 10 April 1821) was a Lithuanian painter.

From 1777 to 1784, he studied in Warsaw and Vilnius in theology and was ordained as a priest in 1783. From 1788 onward he was a priest at Vilnius Cathedral. From 1789 to 1792, he visited Germany and Italy. From 1797 onward he was an Educational Commission member. He co-founded the Vilnius Charity Society.

See also
List of Lithuanian painters

References
Universal Lithuanian Encyclopedia

Lithuanian painters
1760 births
1821 deaths
Artists from Vilnius